Ken Göran Fagerberg (born 9 January 1989) is a Swedish professional footballer who plays as a forward for Faroese club Royn Hvalba, where he also is the clubs manager. 

He formerly represented Örgryte IS, Midtjylland, Viborg FF, AC Horsens, Vendsyssel FF. Assyriska FF, and TB Tvøroyri during his career.

References

 in.fo

External links

Official Danish League Stats 

1989 births
Living people
Swedish footballers
Örgryte IS players
FC Midtjylland players
Viborg FF players
AC Horsens players
Vendsyssel FF players
Tvøroyrar Bóltfelag players
Superettan players
Danish Superliga players
Danish 1st Division players
Faroe Islands Premier League players
Swedish expatriate footballers
Expatriate men's footballers in Denmark
Expatriate footballers in the Faroe Islands
Association football forwards
Swedish expatriate sportspeople in the Faroe Islands